The 2022 Reinert Open was a professional tennis tournament played on outdoor clay courts. It was the fourteenth edition of the tournament which was part of the 2022 ITF Women's World Tennis Tour. It took place in Versmold, Germany between 4 and 10 July 2022.

Champions

Singles

  Linda Nosková def.  Ysaline Bonaventure, 6–1, 6–3

Doubles

  Anna Danilina /  Arianne Hartono def.  Ankita Raina /  Rosalie van der Hoek, 6–7(4–7), 6–4, [10–6]

Singles main draw entrants

Seeds

 1 Rankings are as of 27 June 2022.

Other entrants
The following players received wildcards into the singles main draw:
  Mona Barthel
  Julia Middendorf
  Noma Noha Akugue
  Stephanie Wagner

The following players received entry from the qualifying draw:
  Julia Avdeeva
  Tamara Čurović
  Anna Danilina
  Dia Evtimova
  Ekaterina Makarova
  Adrienn Nagy
  Ekaterina Reyngold
  İlay Yörük

The following player received entry as a lucky loser:
  Alexandra Osborne

References

External links
 2022 Reinert Open at ITFtennis.com
 Official website

2022 ITF Women's World Tennis Tour
2022 in German tennis
July 2022 sports events in Germany